Cadarga is a rural locality in the Western Downs Region, Queensland, Australia.

Cadarga's postcode is 4413.

History 

References 

Western Downs Region
Localities in Queensland